Kevin Schindler (born 21 May 1988) is a German former professional footballer who plays as a right winger. He is player and manager of Faroe Islands Premier League side Havnar Bóltfelag.

Club career
Schindler was born in Delmenhorst. While under contract with Bundesliga side Werder Bremen, he went on loan to Hansa Rostock, FC Augsburg and MSV Duisburg.

In July 2017, United Soccer League club FC Cincinnati signed Schindler. Following the end of the 2017 season, FC Cincinnati announced that Schindler's contract had expired and would not be renewed.

References

External links
 
 
 

1988 births
Living people
People from Delmenhorst
Footballers from Lower Saxony
German footballers
Association football forwards
Germany youth international footballers
Germany under-21 international footballers
SV Werder Bremen players
SV Werder Bremen II players
FC Hansa Rostock players
FC Augsburg players
MSV Duisburg players
FC St. Pauli players
SV Wehen Wiesbaden players
FC Cincinnati (2016–18) players
SC Cambuur players
Havnar Bóltfelag players
Bundesliga players
2. Bundesliga players
3. Liga players
Eerste Divisie players
USL Championship players
German football managers
Havnar Bóltfelag managers
German expatriate footballers
German expatriate football managers
German expatriate sportspeople in the United States
Expatriate soccer players in the United States
Expatriate footballers in the Faroe Islands
Expatriate football managers in the Faroe Islands
German expatriate sportspeople in the Faroe Islands